Tuisa Tulimasealii Tasi Patea is a Samoan politician. He is a member of the Human Rights Protection Party.

Tuisa is a lawyer. He was first elected to the Legislative Assembly of Samoa in the 2011 election and appointed Associate Minister of Police and Prisons. He lost his seat in 2016. He subsequently returned to work as a lawyer. In 2018 he was censured by a District Court judge for giving poor advice to a client.

He was re-elected in the newly created Sagaga No. 4 seat in the 2021 election. On 29 June 2021 he resigned as part of the settlement of an election petition. On 12 July 2021 the Supreme Court of Samoa refused permission for the electoral petitions to be withdrawn in order to hear allegations of bribery and treating against Tuisa and FAST candidate Tagaloatele Poloa. The resignation became effective on 28 July. He subsequently contested the resulting by-election, but was unsuccessful.

References

Living people
Members of the Legislative Assembly of Samoa
Human Rights Protection Party politicians
Samoan lawyers
Year of birth missing (living people)